Villages are the basic level administrative subdivisions of the Republic of China, under townships, county-administered cities or districts. There are two types of villages depending on the divisions it belongs to.

Structuring and Sizing
The history of Village in Taiwan could date back to the Hoko system in the Japanese era, which ho changed into village after Republic of China ruled Taiwan. The formation of village helps to divide area in considerations for transportation and city planning. The formation of village and its size depends largely on the county it is located or the population nature of the local area. In counties or districts of limited population, 100 households could form a village whereas in dense populated New Taipei, 1,000 households are necessary to form a village. In very densely populated areas, a village could comprise a population of up to 4,000 households. (Fushan Village of Kaohsiung City contains a population of 39,800) Thus the sizes of village varies widely.

The following are the statistics of villages in each administrative division in June 2018.

Head
The head of a village is elected by the people of the village every four years, the head is subsidized with 45,000 NT per month for local transportation, stationary, postage and bill fees.

The head of a village holds responsibility to accept complaints and suggestions, initiate and hold meetings, handout certificates of various sorts, encourage bill payments and assist filling out of government documents if required.

Example of villages in Taiwan

See also
 Administrative divisions of Taiwan

Notes

References